The Macular Society is a UK charity for anyone affected by central vision loss.

Many of the charity's members have age-related macular degeneration (AMD), but its services are open to people with a variety of retinal conditions including myopic macular degeneration, diabetic retinopathy, and inherited retinal dystrophies such as Stargardt disease, Best disease and Sorsby fundus dystrophy.

The society coordinates activities across the UK from headquarters in Andover, Hampshire. Its core ambition is to beat macular disease through funding research, providing a range of support services, and raising awareness of eye health.

Services
To combat isolation, loneliness and mental ill-health among people with sight loss, the society provides several free services. These include:
 More than 400 local support groups
 Advice and Information Service  
 Telephone counselling  
 Skills training to help people remain independent
 Patient information in large-print, audio or electronic format.

History

 The Macular Society was set up in 1987 by founder Elizabeth Thomas, who was affected by macular degeneration. 
 At the start of 2013 the Society dropped the word disease from its name and updated its visual identity.
 Evidence from Macular Society members was instrumental in the tribunal which resulted in eye surgeon Bobby Qureshi being struck off the medical register. The General Medical Council heard that he had deliberately misled patients about the risks and benefits of surgery to implant artificial lenses into their eyes.
 Each year the Society recognises excellence in patient care and thanks its most dedicated volunteers with a series of awards.
 In 2020, the Macular Society was named the Association of Optometrists' Charity of the Year.

Patrons

 Gemma Craven
 Henry Blofeld OBE
 Gwyn Dickinson MBE
 Patricia Greene
 Vince Hill
 Maggie Norden
 Zac Shaw

Former patrons include Peter Sallis, Denis Norden and Eric Sykes.

References

Health charities in the United Kingdom